SamSam is a children's computer-animated superhero television series based on a character created by Serge Bloch and directed by Tanguy de Kermel in association with Bayard Presse. His son inspired him to base the program's eponymous character on him. The series has generally received positive reviews due to its great concept, animation, theme tune, tone, life lessons, quotes, and the main character himself. It has aired for  episodes and three seasons.

Serge Bloch was inspired to create the series by his son, and he loved Batman very much. Once, they made him a prop Batman costume out of cardboard. One time, Serge's friends came to dinner with them, and their son was dressed in a Batman superhero costume with plastic parts. This meeting of two "mini-Batmen" amazed and touched the creator. Soon after, he began sketching in a notebook, creating his own world, which takes place in the superhero universe. Another day, the editor Marie-Agnes Godard saw this notebook, and without her participation, SamSam would never have appeared. SamSam first appeared on the pages of the children's magazine "Pomme d' Api" in January 2000.
SamSam has the traits of Serge's son. His name is Samuel, but the parents call him SamSam. When the creator ran out of ideas, it was enough to watch the children. Some kind of problem at school or a quarrel with a friend, all these situations became a source of inspiration for Serge. This suggests that some of the events mentioned in the comics (and maybe in the series) could be a slightly altered reality.

As well as being a HD program, SamSam is also a comic that is printed in many of Bayard Presse's magazines such as Pomme D'Api (French) and StoryBox (English).

The series is produced using Autodesk 3ds Max 3D software.

Synopsis 

The main character, SamSam, is considered the smallest superhero. He does not know properly how to use his powers. He flies his SamSaucer into space to deal with BeastlyBeard and his crew or King Marthial the 1st. He receives assistance from SamTeddy, SamMummy, SamDaddy, SweetPea, SuperJulie, and Megalactic.

Broadcast and viewership 
SamSam has been shown on TV in many countries around the world and in many different languages, including English, French, Cantonese, Arabic, German, Italian, Spanish, Russian and Portuguese. 

In the United Kingdom, SamSam was shown on Action Stations! (ITV4 and CITV) at 6am, on weekends in the Wakey! Wakey! and is now also being shown on Pop and Tiny Pop. It is also on ABC in Australia, on France 5 in Zouzous in France, and TV Tokyo at Japan, as well as being shown in Malaysia, Korea, Taiwan, Pakistan, Hong Kong, Singapore, Indonesia, Japan, Thailand, the United States, Canada, Spain, Italy, Russia, Scandinavia, Iceland, Portugal, Poland, the UAE and Israel. 

It has also been shown as in-flight entertainment on Air France.

SamSam has been viewed by a cumulative audience of 250 million worldwide. It has a strong European audience: – It airs on France 5 in Ludo, Gulli and Canal J, with a 32% viewing share among 4-10 year-olds. It has aired in the UK on ITV4, Citv, Pop and Tiny Pop and has been the 2nd best performing program at weekday breakfast on GMTV, the 2nd top commercial channel for kids programming, across all time in UK. In Italy, SamSam airs on Rai 2 and Boomerang with a market share of 36.6% among 4-14 year-olds. SamSam airs in Spain on Boomerang, Cartoon Network and TV3 with a viewing share of 34%, more than the channel's average.

In Norway, it was the most watched early morning programme among 2-5-year-olds, holding a 48.5% market share. In Denmark, SamSam airs on TV 2, holding a market share of 48.8%, more than twice the other youth programmes' market share in this block.

SamSam received a rating of 6.8/10 on IMDb, based on 45 votes.

The English-language version of the theme song was written by Todd Michael Schultz and produced by Stephen Marston.

In 2018, a 3rd season for SamSam was announced, which is coming out in 2022 (now delayed until 2023).

Crew

Director 
Tanguy de Kermel

Writers 
Alexandre Réverend (Series 1)
Didier Lejeune (Series 2)

Art direction 
Eric Guillon

Music 
Ange Ginozzi
Bruno Bartoli

Film

A film adaptation of the same name was released in France on 5 February 2020, directed by Tanguy de Kermel and written by Valérie Magis and Jean Regnaud. It was produced by Folivari and distributed by StudioCanal.

References

External links
 StoryBox information page
 

2000s French animated television series
2007 French television series debuts
French children's animated space adventure television series
French children's animated fantasy television series
French children's animated superhero television series
France Télévisions children's television series
Stop-motion animated television series
StudioCanal films
StudioCanal animated films
Animated television series about children